Anielewo may refer to the following places:
Anielewo, Konin County in Greater Poland Voivodeship (west-central Poland)
Anielewo, Słupca County in Greater Poland Voivodeship (west-central Poland)
Anielewo, Kuyavian-Pomeranian Voivodeship (north-central Poland)